Verity Ockenden (born 31 August 1991) is a British athlete. She competed in the women's 3000 metres event at the 2021 European Athletics Indoor Championships, where she won the bronze medal.

References

External links

1991 births
Living people
British female middle-distance runners
Place of birth missing (living people)